The German invasion of Denmark, was the German attack on Denmark on 9 April 1940, during the Second World War. The attack was a prelude to the invasion of Norway (9 April – 10 June 1940).

Denmark's strategic importance for Germany was limited. The invasion's primary purpose was to use Denmark as a staging ground for operations against Norway, and to secure supply lines to the forces about to be deployed there. An extensive network of radar systems was built in Denmark to detect British bombers bound for Germany.

The attack on Denmark was a breach of the non-aggression pact Denmark had signed with Germany less than a year earlier. The initial plan was to push Denmark to accept that German land, naval and air forces could use Danish bases, but Adolf Hitler subsequently demanded that both Norway and Denmark be invaded.

Denmark's military forces were inferior in numbers and equipment, and after a short battle were forced to surrender. After less than two hours of struggle, Danish Prime Minister Thorvald Stauning ended the opposition to the German attack, for fear that the Germans would bomb Copenhagen (København), as they had done with Warsaw during the invasion of Poland in September 1939. Due to communication difficulties, some Danish forces continued to fight, but after a further two hours, all opposition had stopped.

Lasting approximately six hours, the German ground campaign against Denmark was one of the shortest military operations of the Second World War.

Background 
The attack on Denmark was part of Operation Weserübung Süd, Germany's plan for the invasion of Norway. Its main purpose was to secure the iron ore that shipped from Narvik. To capture Norway, the Germans had to control the port outside Aalborg (Ålborg) in northern Jutland (Jylland). The Kriegsmarine high command approved of occupying Denmark to extend the German sea-defence network northward, making it harder for British ships to outflank it from the north when attacking ships in the Atlantic. Norway's fjords also provided excellent bases for German submarines in the North Atlantic. The Germans presented the invasion as an act of protection against a supposed imminent attack by the United Kingdom.

German plan of attack 

The German High Command planned a combined assault on Denmark to overrun the country as swiftly as possible. It included an airborne assault on the Aalborg (Ålborg) airfields, a surprise landing of infantry from naval auxiliaries at Copenhagen (København), and a simultaneous ground assault across the Jutland (Jylland) peninsula. On 4 April, Admiral Wilhelm Canaris, chief of the Abwehr and involved in the German resistance to Nazism, warned the Danes of an imminent invasion.

Skirmishes 
Although the Royal Danish Army was warned of the attack, it was denied permission to deploy or prepare defensive positions as the Danish government did not want to give the Germans any provocation for their actions. Only small and scattered units of the frontier guard and elements of the Jutland (Jylland) division were available to meet the land invasion. Believing the attack was imminent, the troops were placed on full alert at 13:30 on 8 April.

Fighting in Jutland 
The Danish border was breached at Sæd, Rens, Padborg, and Krusaa (Kruså) at 04:15 on the 9th. With the Kriegsmarine simultaneously landing troops at Lillebælt, Danish troops at the border were cut off at the beginning of the fighting. The alarm was sounded at 04:17, and the first Danish troops were dispatched at 04:35.

Eastern flank

Lundtoftbjerg 
The first clash between the Danish Army and the invading forces occurred at Lundtoftbjerg, where a Danish anti-tank platoon armed with two 20 mm guns and a light machine gun had taken up positions covering the road. A German column appeared at 04:50, and the 20mm cannons opened fire on the armoured cars while the machine gun took aim at the motorcyclists. A fire started in a nearby barn, filling the air with smoke and hindering the German advance. Eventually the anti-tank platoon was forced to withdraw to Aabenraa (Åbenrå). About 1.5 km (1 mile) to the north, a bicycle platoon prepared a defence of a railway bridge, but fire from the armoured cars and strafing fighter aircraft forced them to retreat, and a third of them were captured. The Germans lost two armoured cars and three motorcycles, while the Danes suffered one dead and one wounded.

Another German column reached Hokkerup a few kilometers east of Lundtoftbjerg at 05:30. They encountered a roadblock made with farm equipment, set up only 20 minutes earlier by 34 Danish soldiers. The Danes knocked out the three leading armoured cars, forcing them to pull back. The Germans set up a 37 mm gun 300 meters (yards) away, but it managed to fire only one round before being knocked out by two rounds from a 20mm gun. Hand-to hand combat ensued in which one Dane was killed and three wounded, one fatally. With air support, the 100 or so Germans managed to surround and capture the Danish unit at 06:15.

Bjergskov 

Seven kilometers (miles) north of Lundtoftbjerg, one motorcycle and two bicycle platoons arrived at Bjergskov at around 05:00. Under Lieutenant Colonel S.E. Clausen the motorcycle troops set up a roadblock with two 20 mm guns while the remaining platoons spread out in the woods. A German column arrived at 06:30. Their tanks pushed the roadblock aside and opened fire. One gun returned fire until a tank drove over it. The gunner attempted to run for cover in the woods but was killed when a German aircraft strafed the road. The second gun malfunctioned. The Danes tried to escape on motorcycles but the Germans surrounded them with armoured vehicles and captured them. A further four Danish soldiers were wounded, while one German armored car was damaged.

Central thrust

Bredevad 

In an encounter between Danish and German forces at Bredevad, 10 km (6 miles) north of the border, a German vanguard of four armoured cars approached the village. The Danes arrived at 6:30 AM and, without time to build a roadblock, took cover in a garden. A machine gun and a 20 mm cannon, manned by one and a half platoons, fired warning shots. When the Germans ignored this, the Danes opened fire from 300 meters (yards) out, knocking out the lead armoured car and killing its driver. A short skirmish followed. The Danes knocked out three more German armoured cars and suffered four casualties. At 07:15 a reinforcing German motorized column arrived from Tinglev, cutting off the Danes and forcing them to surrender. Two Danes were killed and five were wounded.

Rabsted 
A cyclist platoon from Korskro arrived at Rabsted at 6:45. While lying in wait, they managed to capture two German dispatch riders. Learning from them that Bredevad had been taken, they retreated to the northeast via secondary roads.

Aabenraa (Åbenrå) 

As the Danish forces at Søgaard (Søgård) army camp prepared to pull back north to Vejle, where the main force of the Jutland (Jylland) Division was preparing for battle, a short skirmish occurred at Aabenraa (Åbenrå) as the anti-tank platoon from Lundtoftbjerg attacked 15 or so pursuing German vehicles. After disabling a German tank, the rearguard pulled back to Knivsberg. They rendezvoused with a bicycle platoon from Stubbæk Skov, which had suffered one killed and three wounded by German aircraft. The Danish CO ordered them to northern Haderslev.

Haderslev 

Haderslev had a garrison of 225 men of the Jutland (Jylland) Division under Colonel A. Hartz, which defended both the barracks in the town and the road leading to it. Troops in the town mobilized at 07:00 on hearing instructions broadcast from police loudspeaker vans. Bolstered by retreating units, approximately 400 Danes defended the town. Three roadblocks were set up: one with dumping wagons, the other two from spare lumber.
 
At about 07:50 on the southern outskirts of Haderslev, a Danish 37 mm anti-tank gun with a crew of five attacked the approaching armour. Two German tanks lined up adjacent to one another and opened fire. The Danes landed all three of their shots—one in a tank's tracks—but two of the gun crew were killed and the rest wounded. One tank then drove over the gun. Around the curve on Sønderbro Street, two 20 mm cannon and a machine gun put up resistance at the wagon roadblock. The Germans laid down heavy fire. A Danish soldier was killed and two were wounded, but the Germans were effectively pinned down. The fighting continued for ten minutes until the order to surrender was received from Copenhagen (København) by telephone. The Germans were then allowed to proceed into Haderslev, but the Danish garrison stationed there had not received the order to surrender and fired on them. Two German tanks and a motorcycle proceeded unsuspecting towards the barracks, which were defended by the anti-tank unit from Lundtoftbjerg. They opened fire, killing the motorcyclist and blowing the tracks off one tank, sending it crashing into a house. However, the Danish garrison capitulated at 08:15 when the order to surrender finally came through. One Danish soldier was killed while defending the barracks, and three civilians were killed in the crossfire.

Western flank

Abild and Sølsted 
The first fighting in Western Jutland (Jylland) occurred against the Tønder garrison, which was dispatched to Abild and Sølsted.
At Abild, a Danish 20 mm gun crew knocked out two German armoured cars of the German 11th Motorized Regiment before pulling back. At Sølsted, a Danish anti-tank unit consisting of fewer than 50 men set up a defensive position with a 20 mm gun on a road. When a force of the German 11th Motorized Regiment approached, the Danes opened fire as soon as the first German armoured car came within range. The first vehicle was knocked out and ended up in a ditch, while the next continued forward, but pulled back after being hit. It was hit several more times, but was able to fire back. German infantry attempted twice to outflank the Danish positions, but both attempts were met with heavy fire and they became bogged down. Seeing that his attack was failing, the German regimental commander radioed for support and three German Henschel Hs 126 aircraft soon appeared. They bombed and strafed the Danish force until the Danish commander ordered his troops to fall back to Bredebo. In spite of this, no Danish casualties were reported. When the men of the Tønder garrison reached Bredebro, the order to capitulate had been issued and the fighting was over.

Airborne landings 
At approximately 05:00, history's first paratrooper attack took place. 96 Fallschirmjäger jumped from nine Junkers Ju 52 transport aircraft to secure Storstrøm Bridge, connecting the island of Falster with Zealand (Sjælland) and the coastal fortress on Masnedø island. The elite German troops expected heavy fighting around the fortress, but much to their surprise, only two privates and an officer were found inside. The landing opened the way for a battalion of the 198. Infanterie-Division to advance on Copenhagen (København) by land.

Two hours later, a platoon of paratroopers from the 4th battalion of Fallschirmjäger Regiment I landed in Aalborg (Ålborg), the main city of northern Jutland (Jylland), to secure Weserübung Süd's primary target: the airfield at Aalborg (Ålborg), to be used as a stepping-stone for the invasion of Norway. The Fallschirmjägers encountered no resistance, and in less than an hour German aircraft were landing there in huge numbers. More than 200 landings and takeoffs were recorded on the first day, most of them transporting troops and fuel to Fornebu Airport in Norway.

In Esbjerg, a 75mm anti-aircraft gun damaged a German aircraft.

Naval landings 

In order to capture the connections between Jutland (Jylland) and Zealand (Sjælland), the Kriegsmarine landed more troops from the 198th Infantry Division at Funen (Fyn).

At the same time, troops supported by the battleship Schleswig-Holstein landed in Korsør and Nyborg, cutting off connections between Funen (Fyn) and Zealand (Sjælland). Meeting no resistance, the troops in Korsør reached Copenhagen (København) at noon.

Shortly earlier, at 03:55, the Germans made a surprise attack on Gedser, Denmark's southernmost city. They utilized the local ferry from Warnemünde, which they crammed with troops. Soldiers swarmed inland and cut telephone lines. Armour and motorcycles followed, and rapidly advanced to and captured the Storstrøm Bridge together with the paratroopers.

Capture of Copenhagen (København) 

To secure Denmark's quick surrender, the capture of the capital city was considered essential. At 04:20 the 2,430 ton minelayer , with an escort of the icebreaker  and two patrol boats, entered Copenhagen (København) harbour with battle flags flying. The harbour was covered by the coastal artillery guns of Fort Middelgrund. The newly appointed Danish commander ordered a warning shot to be fired, but the recently arrived recruits could not operate the gun. After landing a battalion of the 198th Infantry at 05:18, German forces captured the 70-strong garrison of the Citadel, the headquarters of the Danish Army, without a single shot. Their next target was Amalienborg Palace, residence of the Danish royal family.

Amalienborg and capitulation 

When the German infantry arrived at Amalienborg, they were met with determined opposition from the on-duty company of the King's Royal Guard, which repulsed the initial attack but suffered three wounded. The fighting intensified as reinforcements hastily arrived from Rosenborg Barracks equipped with multiple Madsen machine gun. The German advance was stopped dead, as intense street fighting ensued around Amalienborg.  The dogged resistance of the Royal Guard gave King Christian X and his ministers time to confer with the Danish commander-in-chief General Prior. During the discussions, several formations of Heinkel He 111 and Dornier Do 17 bombers from Kampfgeschwader 4 roared over the city dropping OPROP! leaflets. Faced with the explicit threat of Luftwaffe bombing Copenhagen's civilian population, all but General Prior favoured surrender. The argument for surrender was that Denmark's military position was untenable. Its land and population were too small to hold out against Germany for any sustained period, and its flat terrain would be easily overrun by German panzers. (Jutland (Jylland), for instance, was wide open to a panzer attack from Schleswig-Holstein to the south.) Unlike Norway, Denmark had no mountain ranges where a drawn-out resistance could be mounted.  On the other hand, Denmark had significant water obstacles between the panzers and the capital city, Copenhagen (København), a long coastline, and a significant navy that could expect help from Great Britain and France. A third option, the government going into exile as the Czechoslovakian government had done, was not chosen. The Danish government ordered a ceasefire at 06:00, and formally capitulated at 08:34 in exchange for retaining political independence in domestic matters.

The order of standing down and the disarmament of the Royal Guard, infuriated the Guardsmen, who was still confident that they could expel the Germans from the capital. It culminated in an uproar, where the Guardsmen attempted to rearm themselves. It was only because the officers argued that even if they succeeded in expelling the initial Germans troops from the capital, further overwhelming forces would arrive, that the Guardsmen abandoned the attempt.

Fate of the Danish Air Services 

The entire four squadron Danish Army Air Service was stationed at Værløse near Copenhagen (København). In anticipation of the German invasion, they had prepared to disperse to airfields around the country, but this had not been accomplished by 05:25 when Luftwaffe aircraft appeared over the airbase. As the German aircraft reached Værløse, one Fokker C.V-E reconnaissance aircraft was getting airborne, but was shot down by a Messerschmitt Bf 110 flown by Hauptmann Wolfgang Falck at an altitude of 50 metres (200'). Both crew members were killed. The German Bf 110s then strafed the base under heavy anti-aircraft fire. They destroyed 11 aircraft and badly damaged another 14 as they taxied to take-off, wiping out most of the Danish Army Air Service in one action. The Danish Navy Air Service remained at its bases and escaped damage.

1st company of the 11th battalion 

While most of the Danish Army followed the order to surrender, one unit refused. Colonel , commander of the 4th Regiment at Roskilde, believed that the order to surrender had been forced on the government by the Germans and that Sweden had also been attacked. Bennike and his unit boarded the ferry in Elsinore to Sweden and went into exile. When the misunderstanding was later cleared up, most of the Danish soldiers stayed in Sweden and would form the core of the Danish Brigade in Sweden in 1943.

Casualties 

For propaganda purposes, the German High Command tried to present the invasion of Denmark as a peaceful one, so it would be believed that Denmark did not put up any resistance to it.

In his first monograph, author Kay Søren Nielsen states that in the archives of the Danish weapons manufacturer DISA (Danish Industrial Syndicate), 203 German soldiers were claimed to be killed in Jutland (Jylland).
The report was made in cooperation with the German Waffenamt which gives it weight. This number is also backed up by testimonies from veterans and eyewitnesses, including the veteran Frode Jensen, who after the battle was over, was told by the Germans, that they had lost 18 men while his unit had only suffered 2 casualties.

However, the number is considered an exaggeration by many historians.

In 2015, the Journal of Military History, Krigshistorisk Tidsskrift, published an article for the Royal Danish Defence College (RDDC), in which military correspondent Lt. Col Jürgensen H.J. (ret.) summarized key points in the German invasion. He argued that actual German losses were 2-3 killed and 25-30 wounded, and that the Danish military suffered a confirmed 16 dead and 20 wounded. Casualties among the civil resistance is not certain, but are given as 10 dead and 3 wounded.

Military historian David T. Zabecki notes in "Germany at War: 400 Years of Military History" that Denmark suffered 49 casualties (26 killed and 23 wounded), and that 20 German soldiers were killed or wounded.

Other than the casualties at the front, a few aircraft were shot down or crashed, a tugboat sank after a collision with a German vessel in the Great Belt and the German battleship Schleswig-Holstein was temporarily grounded west of Agersø.

Order of Battle 
Order of Battle for both the Royal Danish Army and German Army.

Royal Danish Army 

 Headquarters under Lieutenant general William Wain Prior at Copenhagen
 1st (Zealand) Infantry Division
 Headquarters - Copenhagen
 Life Guards
 Headquarters - Copenhagen
 1st Battalion
 2nd Battalion
 3rd Battalion
 1st Infantry Regiment
 Headquarters - Copenhagen
 1st Battalion
 15th Battalion
 21st Battalion
 24th Battalion
 4th Infantry Regiment
 Headquarters -Roskilde
 8th Battalion - Holbæk
 11th Battalion - Roskilde
 17th Battalion - Præstø
 28th Battalion - Roskilde
 Infantry Artillery Company - Roskilde
 5th Infantry Regiment
 Headquarters - Vordingborg
 7th Battalion
 14th Battalion - Slagelse
 19th Battalion
 25th Battalion
 Guard Hussar Regiment
 Headquarters - Copenhagen
 1st Battalion
 2nd Battalion
 3rd Battalion
 1st Motorized Artillery Regiment
 Headquarters -Avedørelejren
 1st Field Battalion
 2nd Heavy Field Battalion
 6th Heavy Field Battalion
 2nd Motorized Artillery Regiment
 Headquarters - Holbæk
 4th Field Battalion
 5th Field Battalion
 11th Field Battalion
 12th Field Battalion
 13th Anti-Aircraft Artillery Battalion - Copenhagen
 1st Engineer Battalion - Copenhagen
 2nd (Jutland) Infantry Division
 Headquarters - Viborg
 2nd Infantry Regiment
 Headquarters - Sønderborg
 3rd Battalion - Sønderborg
 13th Battalion - Haderslev
 18th Battalion - Sønderborg
 22nd Battalion - Haderslev
 Infantry Artillery Company - Haderslev
 3rd Infantry Regiment
 Headquarters - Viborg
 6th Battalion
 9th Battalion
 20th Battalion
 23rd Battalion
 6th Infantry Regiment
 Headquarters - Odense
 4th Bicycle Infantry Battalion - Søgaard
 5th Battalion
 16th Battalion
 26th Battalion
 7th Infantry Regiment
 Headquarters - Frederica
 2nd Battalion - Tønder
 10th Battalion - Frederica
 12th Battalion - Sønderborg
 27th Battalion - Frederica
 Jutland Dragoon Regiment
 Headquarters - Randers
 1st Cavalry Squadron - Randers
 2nd Cavalry Squadron - Randers
 Armoured Reconnaissance Squadron - Aarhus
 1st Bicycle Reconnaissance Squadron - Aarhus
 2nd Bicycle Reconnaissance Squadron - Aarhus
 3rd Bicycle Reconnaissance Squadron - Aarhus
 3rd Field Artillery Regiment
 Headquarters - Aarhus
 3rd Field Battalion
 7th Heavy Field Battalion
 8th Field Battalion
 9th Field Battalion
 14th Anti-Aircraft Battalion
 Jydske Engineer Regiment
 Infantry Pioneer Command
 Headquarters
 1st Pioneer Engineer Battalion
 2nd Pioneer Engineer Battalion
 Army Aviation Troops
 Zealand Group
 Headquarters - Værløse
 1st Fighter Interceptor Squadron
 3rd Reconnaissance Squadron
 Jutland Group
 Headquarters - Værløse
 2nd Transporter-Bomber Squadron
 5th Reconnaissance Squadron
 Værløse Supply Base Group
 Værløse Training Base
 Air Defence Regiment
 Engineer Regiment
 Bornholm Defense Force
 Signal Regiment
 Service Troops

Heer 

 Headquarters under XXXI Corps Denmark Command
 170th Infantry Division
 391st Infantry Regiment
 Headquarters Company
 1st Battalion
 2nd Battalion
 3rd Battalion
 399th Infantry Regiment
 Headquarters Company
 1st Battalion
 2nd Battalion
 3rd Battalion
 2nd Battalion, 602nd Transport Battalion
 401st Infantry Regiment
 Headquarters Company
 1st Battalion
 2nd Battalion
 240th Field Artillery Regiment
 Headquarters Battery
 1st Battalion
 2nd Battalion
 3rd Battalion
 170th Brigade Headquarters
 240th Anti-Tank Artillery Battery
 240th Bicycle Reconnaissance Squadron
 240th Engineer Battalion
 240th Signal Battalion
 240th Divisional Train
 198th Infantry Division
 305th Infantry Regiment
 Headquarters Company
 1st Battalion
 2nd Battalion
 3rd Battalion
 308th Infantry Regiment
 Headquarters Company
 1st Battalion
 2nd Battalion
 3rd Battalion
 326th Infantry Regiment
 Headquarters Company
 1st Battalion
 2nd Battalion
 235th Artillery Regiment
 Headquarters Battalion
 1st Battalion
 2nd Battalion
 3rd Battalion
 198th Brigade Headquarters
 235th Anti-Tank Artillery Battery
 235th Bicycle Reconnaissance Squadron
 235th Engineer Battalion
 235th Signal Battalion
 235th Divisional Train
 11th Motorized Brigade
 11th Brigade Headquarters
 110th Infantry Regiment
 Headquarters
 1st Battalion
 2nd Battalion
 110th Motorcycle Company
 110th Transport Detachment
 111th Infantry Regiment
 Headquarters
 1st Battalion
 2nd Battalion
 111th Motorcycle Company
 111th Transport Detachment
 3rd Battalion, 677th Artillery Regiment
 40th Armoured Detachment
 Direct Controlled Corps Units
 4th Machine-Gun Battalion
 13th Machine-Gun Battalion
 14th Machine-Gun Battalion
 6th SS Infantry Regiment
 2x Squads - 23rd Panzer Battalion
 2x Squads - 24th Panzer Battalion
 2x Squads - 25th Panzer Battalion
 2nd Battery, 729th Artillery Battalion
 3rd Battery, 729th Artillery Battalion
 431st Signal Corps Battalion
 431st Supply Corps Battalion
 431st Motorcycle Courier Platoon
 431st Field Post Platoon
 431st Military Police Platoon
 431st Rations Admin Platoon
 24th Railroad Construction Engineer Company
 634th Field Hospital
 2nd Company, 615th Field Ambulance
 676th Military Government Commandment Regiment
 436th Military Government Commandment Regiment
 633rd Military Government Commandment Regiment
 716th Military Government Commandment Regiment
 Gruft Luftwaffe Regiment
 Headquarters
 2nd Heavy Reconnaissance Squadron, 10th Reconnaissance Regiment
 1st Mixed Anti-Aircraft Battalion, Gruft Group
 1st Mixed Anti-Aircraft Battalion, 8th Regiment
 2nd Mixed Anti-Aircraft Battalion, 19th Regiment
 Kluge Infantry Detachment Battalion

Aftermath and legacy

The Danes capitulated within six hours, resulting in a uniquely lenient occupation, as the Germans were content to leave the Aryan Danes to manage their own affairs. Danish soldiers were disarmed that afternoon, and those captured were allowed to return to their units. The following day, the island of Bornholm was occupied without incident. The Royal Danish Army was severely reduced after the invasion, with only a 3,300-strong "Life Guard" unit allowed to remain. Many Danish merchant ships were caught out abroad following the sudden and rapid invasion. Approximately 240 of these ships were incorporated into the Allied merchant navy while ships still in Danish ports served the Germans in transporting iron ore.  A handful of Danish soldiers and pilots escaped to the United Kingdom either directly by plane or via neutral Sweden. Those who escaped either served amongst the RAF or SOE. 

Following the reported peaceful occupation of Denmark, Allied views on Denmark were contemptuous. It was alleged that a boxing commentator had said "without fighting—like a Dane" concerning a first-round knockout. Danes have since adopted the saying "".

See also 
List of Danish military equipment of World War II
List of German military equipment of World War II 
 April 9th, a 2015 Danish film about Danish bicycle infantry during the German invasion

References

Citations

Bibliography

External links
 
 
 

1940 in Denmark
Denmark
Battles and operations of World War II involving Denmark
Battles of World War II involving Germany
Conflicts in 1940
Denmark–Germany military relations
Denmark 1940
Invasions of Denmark
Military history of Denmark during World War II
World War II invasions